Trespassers  is the sixth album by the Danish band Kashmir. It was released on 1 February 2010.

Track listing
"Mouthful of Wasps" – 5:16
"Intruder" – 4:24
"Mantaray" – 4:10
"Pallas Athena" – 2:28
"Still Boy" – 5:12
"Bewildered in the City" – 6:29
"Pursuit of Misery" – 4:07
"Time Has Deserted Us" – 4:04
"Danger Bear" – 3:40
"The Indian (That Dwells in This Chest)" – 5:23
 "Track 11" - Hidden Track - 7:01

Singles
"Mouthful of Wasps" (30 November 2009)
"Still Boy"
"Pursuit of Misery"
"Bewildered in the City"

Charts

External links

References

2010 albums
Kashmir (band) albums
Albums produced by Andy Wallace (producer)
Albums recorded at Electric Lady Studios